An Anglo-Saxon Dictionary is a dictionary of Old English, a language that is also known as Anglo-Saxon. Four editions of the dictionary were published. It has often (especially in earlier times) been considered the definitive lexicon for Old English. It is often referred to by the names of its compilers, for example Bosworth or Bosworth & Toller.

Editions

1838 edition 
This was written by Joseph Bosworth, who in 1858 became the Rawlinsonian Professor of Anglo-Saxon at the University of Oxford: the post was renamed in 1916 as the Rawlinson and Bosworth Professorship of Anglo-Saxon, in Bosworth's honour.

1898 edition 
While being attributed to "J. Bosworth & T. N. Toller", this was a revision by Thomas Northcote Toller, based on Bosworth's 1838 dictionary, Bosworth's papers, and additions by Toller.

1921 edition 
Thomas Northcote Toller issued a supplement in 1921.

1972 edition 
Alistair Campbell issued an edition with "enlarged addenda and corrigenda" in 1972.

See also
Toronto Dictionary of Old English, an attempt to compile a comprehensive and exhaustive dictionary beginning in 1970, founding editors Angus Cameron and Christopher Ball.

References
Bosworth, J., & Toller, T. Northcote. (1898). An Anglo-Saxon Dictionary. Oxford: Clarendon Press. (Based on Bosworth's 1838 dictionary, his papers & additions by Toller)
Toller, T. Northcote. (1921). An Anglo-Saxon Dictionary: Supplement. Oxford: Clarendon Press.
Campbell, A. (1972). An Anglo-Saxon Dictionary: Enlarged addenda and corrigenda. Oxford: Clarendon Press.

External links
An Anglo-Saxon Dictionary Online
The 1838 edition.
An OCR text version of the 1898 edition.

Old English dictionaries
1838 books